Charles E. Klingbeil (November 2, 1965 – June 19, 2018) was an American football and Canadian football defensive tackle in the National Football League and Canadian Football League. He was signed by the Saskatchewan Roughriders as an undrafted free agent in 1989. He played college football at Northern Michigan.

Klingbeil was a member of the Roughriders team that won the 1989 Grey Cup, and he was named the defensive MVP of the game.

In the NFL, Klingbeil played five seasons for the Miami Dolphins. He scored the game-winning touchdown in coach Don Shula's 300th win, recovering a fourth-quarter Don Majkowski fumble in the end zone to propel the Dolphins to a 16–13 victory over the Green Bay Packers.

Following his playing career, he worked as an assistant coach at various colleges, but also had several run-ins with the law. In 2008, Klingbeil was charged with larceny. While a coach at Michigan Technological University in 2013, Klingbeil was charged with misdemeanor possession of prescription drugs, to which he pleaded guilty.

He died on June 19, 2018 in Chicago while returning to the Copper Country, Michigan, where he lived.

References

External links
Saskatchewan Roughriders bio

1965 births
2018 deaths
People from Houghton, Michigan
Players of American football from Michigan
American players of Canadian football
American football defensive tackles
Canadian football defensive linemen
Northern Michigan Wildcats football players
Saskatchewan Roughriders players
Miami Dolphins players